Orcs Must Die! 3 is a 2020 action-tower defense video game developed and published by Robot Entertainment. It is the fourth installment in the Orcs Must Die! series, and the direct sequel to Orcs Must Die! 2. It was released as a timed exclusive on Stadia on July 14, 2020, and for Windows, PlayStation 4, Xbox One and Xbox Series X/S on July 23, 2021.

Gameplay 
Similar to its predecessor and the original game, Orcs Must Die! 3 is a variation on a tower defense game. The player takes the role of one of two apprentice war mages and is tasked to defend rifts from an onslaught of orc armies by using the characters' weapons and special abilities, as well as setting traps. The game launched with 18 different levels.

Besides the standard Story game mode, the game includes an Endless mode and Weekly Challenges game mode. Unlike its predecessors, it includes a War Scenarios game mode, which tasks a player to defend against armies of orcs at a much larger scale (up to 1,000). This mode utilizes oversized traps, referred to as War Machines, to defend a castle and its rift from larger armies.

The game allows for two-player cooperative multiplayer mode.

Plot 
The story picks up 20 years after the events in Orcs Must Die! 2.

Expansions 
An expansion entitled "Drastic Steps" was released November 6, 2020. The expansion includes a new story campaign, 5 new scenarios, an endless map, weapons, traps, enemies, and hero cosmetics to the game.

An expansion entitled "Cold as Eyes" was announced on October 7, 2021 and is planned for release on November 11, 2021.

Reception
 

Orcs Must Die! 3 received "mixed or average" reviews for Stadia and "generally favorable" reviews for Windows according to the review aggregation website Metacritic.

Jeremy Peel of PC Gamer said "Robot Entertainment has shown it still knows exactly how to make Orcs Must Die!" and defined the game as a "conservative but confident return to form from the masters of a much-loved genre".

References

External links
 Official website
 

2020 video games
Tower defense video games
Fantasy video games
Video game sequels
Video games developed in the United States
Video games featuring female protagonists
Video games set in castles
Stadia games
Windows games
PlayStation 4 games
PlayStation 5 games
Xbox One games
Xbox Series X and Series S games
Multiplayer and single-player video games
Cooperative video games
Unreal Engine games
Orcs in popular culture
Robot Entertainment games